The Men's 50 km Race Walk at the 1980 Summer Olympics in Moscow, USSR had an entry list of 27 competitors. Three athletes were disqualified and nine did not finish in the final, held on 30 July 1980. This event was not conducted in 1976, it was last held in 1972.

This event netted Spain its first ever medal in athletics, with Jordi Llopart taking silver.

Medalists

Final ranking

See also
 1978 Men's European Championships 50 km Walk (Prague)
 1982 Men's European Championships 50 km Walk (Athens)
 1983 Men's World Championships 50 km Walk (Helsinki)
 1986 Men's European Championships 50 km Walk (Stuttgart)

References

External links
 Results

 5
Racewalking at the Olympics
Men's events at the 1980 Summer Olympics